Robert Fisher (born 1943) was a Professor of Education at Brunel University, with a particular interest in the teaching of Philosophy to children. He published several books including:

 Unlocking literacy: a guide for teachers 
 Teaching Children to Think
 Teaching Thinking: philosophical enquiry in the classroom

References

British educational theorists
Academics of Brunel University London
1943 births
Living people